Şakşuka is a Turkish side dish or meze made of vegetables cooked in olive oil. The particular vegetable may vary from region to region, but eggplant is a common choice. In Balıkesir şakşuka is made with green tomatoes. The dish sometimes includes potato and peppers as well.

Although it shares the same etymology as shakshouka (from a North African Arabic dialect meaning "mixed"), Turkish şakşuka is a completely different dish which does not include eggs and is therefore vegan. The closest analogue to shakshouka in Turkish cuisine is menemen, which is essentially a shakshouka without harissa.

See also
 Shakshouka
 Chakhchoukha

References

Salads
Turkish cuisine
Meze
Eggplant dishes